Marianne is the national personification of France.

Marianne may also refer to:

Film and television
 Marianne (1929 silent film), an American film directed by Robert Z. Leonard
 Marianne (1929 musical film), a remake of the above, also directed by Leonard
 Marianne (1953 film), Swedish drama film directed by Egil Holmsen
 Marianne (1955 film), or Marianne of My Youth, a French-West German drama film
 Marianne (2011 film), a Swedish horror film
 Marianne (TV series), a 2019 French horror streaming series

Songs
 "Marianne" (Sergio Endrigo song), representing Italy at Eurovision 1968; covered by Cliff Richard, 1968
 "Marianne" (Terry Gilkyson song), written by Roaring Lion; covered by Terry Gilkyson and the Easy Riders, and by the Hilltoppers, 1957
 "Marianne", by Gene Pitney, 1965
 "Marianne", by the Human League from Holiday '80, 1980
 "Marianne", by Stephen Stills from Stephen Stills 2, 1971
 "Marianne", by Tori Amos from Boys for Pele, 1996

Other uses
 Marianne (candy), a Finnish mint chocolate candy
 Marianne (given name), including a list of people and fictional characters with the name
 Marianne (magazine: 1932-40) a French illustrative magazine
 Marianne (magazine), a French news magazine
 Marianne, Pennsylvania, US
 Marianne Island, a small granitic island of the Seychelles
Marianne, an 1876 novel by George Sand

See also 
Maryanne, a given name
Mary Ann (disambiguation)